Madaoua is a department of the Tahoua Region in Niger. Its capital lies at the city of Madaoua. As of 2011, the department had a total population of 443,902 people.

References

Departments of Niger
Tahoua Region